Tinognathus parviceps is a species of beetle in the family Carabidae, the only species in the genus Tinognathus.

References

Panagaeinae